The Kazunogawa Pumped Storage Power Station is a pumped-storage hydroelectric power station near Kōshū in Yamanashi Prefecture, Japan.
Construction on the power station began in 1993 and the first generator was commissioned on 3 December 1999. The second was commissioned on 8 June 2000. The third one became operational on 9 June 2014, six year early due to post-power demand from the Great East Japan earthquake.  The fourth and final generator is slated to be commissioned by 2024. It is owned by TEPCO and was constructed at a cost of US$2.2 billion.

Design and operation

The lower reservoir is formed by the Kazunogawa Dam  (葛野川ダム), which uses water from the Sagami River system.

When energy demand is low and therefore inexpensive, the turbines reverse into pumps and send water from the lower reservoir back to the upper reservoir. The process is repeated when necessary to help balance electricity loads.

See also

Fukashiro Dam – located downstream of Kazunogawa Dam
List of pumped-storage hydroelectric power stations

References

Dams completed in 1999
Energy infrastructure completed in 1999
Energy infrastructure completed in 2000
Energy infrastructure completed in 2014
Buildings and structures in Yamanashi Prefecture
Pumped-storage hydroelectric power stations in Japan
Underground power stations
1999 establishments in Japan